Sons of the Sun is the sixth studio album by American country music duo The Bellamy Brothers. It was released in 1980 via Warner Bros. and Curb Records. The albums includes the singles "Lovers Live Longer" and "Do You Love as Good as You Look".

Track listing

Personnel
Adapted from liner notes.

Bellamy Brothers & Diamond Back
David and Howard Bellamy - lead and harmony vocals, acoustic guitar
Jesse Chambers - bass guitar
Randy Ferrell - lead, acoustic and classical guitars
Dannie Jones - steel guitar, lap steel guitar, dobro
Jon LaFrandre - piano, organ, keyboards, background vocals
Rodney Price - drums

Guest Musicians
Ricky Skaggs - fiddle, mandolin
Bobbye Hall - percussion

Chart performance

References

1980 albums
The Bellamy Brothers albums
Warner Records albums
Curb Records albums